Fiskars (Swedish) is a village, now part of the town of Raseborg, in western Uusimaa, Finland. The village is the site of the former Fiskars Bruk, which was founded in 1649 and gave rise to the company Fiskars.

The most notable architectural attraction of Fiskars is a mansion designed in 1818 by Italian-born architect Charles Bassi. The village, which has less than 1000 inhabitants, is a popular tourist destination in summer, and hosts an artisan and artist community. The river Fiskarså (Swedish), Fiskarinjoki or Fiskarsinjoki (Finnish) has contributed to the industrialisation of the village.

History
The village of Fiskars developed around the ironworks founded by German-born Petter Thorwöste in 1649. The ironworks also produced copper. In 1822, John Jacob von Julin bought the ironworks and founded a fine production facility in 1830 and Finland's first workshop in 1836. The development of the industrial community was fast, and the factories and workshops produced utility items from scissors and puukko knives to ploughs and power transmission devices. To transport the products, a narrow-gauge railroad from Fiskars to the Pohjankuru harbour was in use from 1891 to 1952. The history of the Fiskars company begins from the Fiskars Bruk, but the company no longer has active factories in the village.

Current situation
Nowadays, the factory is a lively centre of Finnish art and design. There are about 600 people living in the factory area and it is very popular among artists, artisans and designers. Especially in summer, the Fiskars Bruk is a popular tourist destination. Also in winter, various exhibitions and conference, accommodation and restaurant services, as well as workshops and shops provide things to see and experience. In 2019, the village launched a new festival, the Fiskars Village Art & Design Biennale. Several leading Finnish designers and design brands are based in the Fiskars village, including Kim Simonsson, Karin Widnäs, Nikari and Feathr.

Sport
Fiskars hosted the inaugural World Orienteering Championships, 1–2 October 1966.

References

External links

 Official site
 Porvoo & Fiskars: idyllic & creative towns near Helsinki – Visit Finland

Villages in Finland
Populated places established in 1649
1649 establishments in Sweden